Dywity  is a village in Olsztyn County, Warmian-Masurian Voivodeship, in northern Poland. It is the seat of the gmina (administrative district) called Gmina Dywity. It is located on the Dywickie Lake in Warmia.

The village has a population of 2,300. 

In the late 19th century, the population of the village was overwhelmingly Polish.

References

External links
 Kreisgemeinschaft Allenstein-Land e.V. Diwitten

Populated lakeshore places in Poland
Villages in Olsztyn County